Windrush may refer to:

Places in England
 Windrush Square, precinct in south London
 River Windrush, a river in Gloucestershire
 Windrush, Gloucestershire, a village in Gloucestershire
 RAF Windrush, a Royal Air Force station in World War II

Other uses 
 HMT Empire Windrush, a ship synonymous with postwar immigration of West Indian people to the UK
 "Windrush generation", people of British African-Caribbean heritage
 Windrush (TV series), 1998, a BBC TV documentary marking the 50th anniversary of the first immigration disembarkation to Britain from the ship
 Windrush scandal, 2018, in which some of the "Windrush generation" were wrongly deported from Britain as illegal immigrants